Grandison Delaney Royston (December 9, 1809 – August 14, 1889) was a prominent Arkansas politician. He was born in Carter County, Tennessee and later moved to Arkansas. He served in the Arkansas House of Representatives in 1837 and the Arkansas State Senate in 1858. He represented the state in the First Confederate Congress from 1862 to 1864.

References

External links

Grandison Delaney Royston at The Political Graveyard

1809 births
1889 deaths
19th-century American politicians
Arkansas state senators
Burials in Arkansas
Members of the Confederate House of Representatives from Arkansas
Speakers of the Arkansas House of Representatives